Dolž is a settlement in the hills southeast of Novo Mesto in southeastern Slovenia,

Dolz is also a surname and can refer to: 
 Dora Dolz
 María Luisa Dolz
 Oruro Ernesto Dolz
 Paco Pérez-Dolz
 Sonia Herman Dolz